Ong or ONG may refer to:

Arts and media
 Ong's Hat, a collaborative work of fiction
 “Ong Ong”, a song by Blur from the album The Magic Whip

Places
 Ong, Nebraska, US, city
 Ong's Hat, New Jersey, US, ghost town
 Ong River, Odisha, India
 Mornington Island Airport, IATA airport code "ONG"

Other uses
 Ong (surname), Chinese surname
 Ong language of Laos and Vietnam 
 ONE Gas (Oklahoma Natural Gas), a component of ONEOK, Inc.
 Non-governmental organization, abbreviated ONG in French, Italian, Spanish, Romanian and Portuguese (NGO in English)
 Ipomoea aquatica or Ong choi, a semi-aquatic tropical plant grown as a leaf vegetable

See also
 Battle of Ong Thanh, Vietnam (1967)